Garding is a town in the district of Nordfriesland, Schleswig-Holstein, Germany. It has a population of 2,700 (as of 2007). It is located in the Eiderstedt peninsula, and part of the Amt Eiderstedt.

Notable people

 Theodor Mommsen (1817-1903), historian and Nobel laureate; since 1895, honorary citizen of the city of Garding (permanent exhibition in the town hall)
 Tycho Mommsen (1819-1900), writer and high school director
 Richard Petersen (1865-1946), engineer, technical manager for the construction of the Wuppertaler Schwebebahn
 Peter-Jürgen Boock (born 1951), writer and former member of the RAF

Connected with Garding

 Knut Kiesewetter (born 1941), singer and musician, grew up in Garding.
 Otto Beckmann (born 1945), painter, draftsman and graphic artist, rebuilt the mill "Emanuel" in Garding since 1971.

See also
Eiderstedt peninsula

References

External links 

Towns in Schleswig-Holstein
Nordfriesland